

Events

Pre-1600
 915 – Pope John X crowns Berengar I of Italy as Holy Roman Emperor (probable date).

1601–1900
1775 – American Revolutionary War:  becomes the first vessel to fly the Grand Union Flag (the precursor to the Stars and Stripes); the flag is hoisted by John Paul Jones.
1799 – War of the Second Coalition: Battle of Wiesloch: Austrian Lieutenant Field Marshal Anton Sztáray defeats the French at Wiesloch.
1800 – War of the Second Coalition: Battle of Hohenlinden: French General Jean Victor Marie Moreau decisively defeats the Archduke John of Austria near Munich. Coupled with First Consul Napoleon Bonaparte's earlier victory at Marengo, this will force the Austrians to sign an armistice and end the war.
  1800   – United States presidential election: The Electoral College casts votes for president and vice president that result in a tie between Thomas Jefferson and Aaron Burr.
1818 – Illinois becomes the 21st U.S. state.
1834 – The Zollverein (German Customs Union) begins the first regular census in Germany.
1854 – Battle of the Eureka Stockade: More than 20 gold miners at Ballarat, Victoria, are killed by state troopers in an uprising over mining licences.
1881 – The first issue of Tamperean daily newspaper Aamulehti ("Morning Paper") is published.
1898 – The Duquesne Country and Athletic Club defeats an all-star collection of early football players 16–0, in what is considered to be the very first all-star game for professional American football.

1901–present
1901 – In a State of the Union message, U.S. President Theodore Roosevelt delivers a 20,000-word speech to the House of Representatives asking Congress to curb the power of trusts "within reasonable limits".
1904 – The Jovian moon Himalia is discovered by Charles Dillon Perrine at California's Lick Observatory.
1910 – Modern neon lighting is first demonstrated by Georges Claude at the Paris Motor Show.
1912 – Bulgaria, Greece, Montenegro, and Serbia (the Balkan League) sign an armistice with the Ottoman Empire, temporarily halting the First Balkan War. (The armistice will expire on February 3, 1913, and hostilities will resume.)
1919 – After nearly 20 years of planning and construction, including two collapses causing 89 deaths, the Quebec Bridge opens to traffic.
1920 – Following more than a month of Turkish–Armenian War, the Turkish-dictated Treaty of Alexandropol is concluded.
1929 – President Herbert Hoover delivers his first State of the Union message to Congress. It is presented in the form of a written message rather than a speech.
1938 – Nazi Germany issues the Decree on the Utilization of Jewish Property forcing Jews to sell real property, businesses, and stocks at below market value as part of Aryanization. 
1944 – Greek Civil War: Fighting breaks out in Athens between the ELAS and government forces supported by the British Army.
1959 – The current flag of Singapore is adopted, six months after Singapore became self-governing within the British Empire.
1960 – The musical Camelot debuts at the Majestic Theatre on Broadway. It will become associated with the Kennedy administration.
1967 – At Groote Schuur Hospital in Cape Town, South Africa, a transplant team headed by Christiaan Barnard carries out the first heart transplant on a human (53-year-old Louis Washkansky).
1971 – Indo-Pakistani War of 1971: Pakistan launches a pre-emptive strike against India and a full-scale war begins.
1972 – Spantax Flight 275 crashes during takeoff from Tenerife North–Ciudad de La Laguna Airport, killing all 155 people on board.
1973 – Pioneer program: Pioneer 10 sends back the first close-up images of Jupiter.
1979 – In Cincinnati, 11 fans are suffocated in a crush for seats on the concourse outside Riverfront Coliseum before a Who concert.
  1979   – Iranian Revolution: Ayatollah Ruhollah Khomeini becomes the first Supreme Leader of Iran.
1982 – A soil sample is taken from Times Beach, Missouri, that will be found to contain 300 times the safe level of dioxin.
1984 – Bhopal disaster: A methyl isocyanate leak from a Union Carbide pesticide plant in Bhopal, India, kills more than 3,800 people outright and injures 150,000–600,000 others (some 6,000 of whom later died from their injuries) in one of the worst industrial disasters in history.
1989 – In a meeting off the coast of Malta, U.S. President George H. W. Bush and Soviet General Secretary Mikhail Gorbachev release statements indicating that the Cold War between NATO and the Warsaw Pact may be coming to an end.
1992 – The Greek oil tanker Aegean Sea, carrying 80,000 tonnes of crude oil, runs aground in a storm while approaching A Coruña, Spain, and spills much of its cargo.
  1992   – A test engineer for Sema Group uses a personal computer to send the world's first text message via the Vodafone network to the phone of a colleague.
1994 – Taiwan holds its first full local elections; James Soong elected as the first and only directly elected Governor of Taiwan, Chen Shui-bian became the first directly elected Mayor of Taipei, Wu Den-yih became the first directly elected Mayor of Kaohsiung.
1995 – Cameroon Airlines Flight 3701 crashes on approach to Douala International Airport in Douala, Cameroon, killing 71 of the 76 people on board.
1997 – In Ottawa, Ontario, Canada, representatives from 121 countries sign the Ottawa Treaty prohibiting manufacture and deployment of anti-personnel landmines. The United States, People's Republic of China, and Russia do not sign the treaty, however.
1999 – NASA loses radio contact with the Mars Polar Lander moments before the spacecraft enters the Martian atmosphere.
2005 – XCOR Aerospace makes the first crewed rocket aircraft delivery of U.S. Mail in Kern County, California.
2007 – Winter storms cause the Chehalis River to flood many cities in Lewis County, Washington, and close a  portion of Interstate 5 for several days. At least eight deaths and billions of dollars in damages are blamed on the floods.
2009 – A suicide bombing at a hotel in Mogadishu, Somalia, kills 25 people, including three ministers of the Transitional Federal Government.
2012 – At least 475 people are killed after Typhoon Bopha makes landfall in the Philippines.
2014 – The Japanese space agency, JAXA, launches the space explorer Hayabusa2 from the Tanegashima Space Center on a six-year round trip mission to an asteroid to collect rock samples.
2021 – COVID-19 pandemic: New Zealand moves into COVID-19 Protection Framework (Traffic Light System), moving Auckland out of lockdown for fully vaccinated people.

Births

Pre-1600
1368 – Charles VI of France (d. 1422)
1447 – Bayezid II, Ottoman sultan (d. 1512)
1483 – Nicolaus von Amsdorf, German theologian and Protestant reformer (d. 1565)
1560 – Jan Gruter, Dutch scholar and critic (d. 1627)
1590 – Daniel Seghers, Flemish Jesuit brother and painter (d. 1661)

1601–1900
1616 – John Wallis, English mathematician and cryptographer (d. 1703)
1684 – Ludvig Holberg, Norwegian historian and writer (d. 1754)
1722 – Hryhorii Skovoroda, Ukrainian poet, composer, and philosopher (d. 1794)
1729 – Antonio Soler, Spanish composer and theorist (d. 1783)
1730 – Mahadaji Shinde, Maratha ruler of Gwalior (d. 1794)
1755 – Gilbert Stuart, American painter (d. 1828)
1793 – Clarkson Frederick Stanfield, English painter and academic (d. 1867)
1800 – France Prešeren, Slovenian poet and lawyer (d. 1849)
1810 – Louisa Susannah Cheves McCord, American author and political essayist (d. 1879)
1826 – George B. McClellan, American general and politician, 24th Governor of New Jersey (d. 1885)
1827 – Lombe Atthill, Northern Irish obstetrician and gynaecologist (d. 1910)
1833 – Carlos Finlay, Cuban epidemiologist and physician (d. 1915)
1838 – Cleveland Abbe, American meteorologist and academic (d. 1916)
  1838   – Octavia Hill, English activist and author (d. 1912)
  1838   – Princess Louise of Prussia (d. 1923)
1842 – Phoebe Hearst, American philanthropist and activist (d. 1919)
  1842   – Charles Alfred Pillsbury, American businessman, founded the Pillsbury Company (d. 1899)
  1842   – Ellen Swallow Richards, American chemist, ecologist, and educator (d. 1911)
1848 – William Shiels, Irish-Australian politician, 16th Premier of Victoria (d. 1904)
1850 – Richard Butler, English-Australian politician, 23rd Premier of South Australia (d. 1925)
1856 – George Leake, Australian politician, 3rd Premier of Western Australia (d. 1902)
1857 – Joseph Conrad, Polish-born British novelist (d. 1924)
  1857   – Mathilde Kralik, Austrian pianist and composer (d. 1944)
1863 – Gussie Davis, African-American songwriter (d. 1899)
1864 – Herman Heijermans, Dutch author and playwright (d. 1924)
1867 – William John Bowser, Canadian lawyer and politician, 17th Premier of British Columbia (d. 1933)
1872 – Arthur Charles Hardy, Canadian lawyer and politician, Canadian Speaker of the Senate (d. 1962)
  1872   – William Haselden, English cartoonist (d. 1953)
  1875   – Max Meldrum, Scottish-Australian painter and educator (d. 1955)
1878 – Francis A. Nixon, American businessman (d. 1956)
1879 – Albert Asher, New Zealand rugby player (d. 1965)
  1879   – Charles Hutchison, American actor, director, and screenwriter (d. 1949)
  1879   – Kafū Nagai, Japanese author and playwright (d. 1959)
  1879   – Donald Matheson Sutherland, Canadian physician and politician, 5th Canadian Minister of National Defence (d. 1970)
1880 – Fedor von Bock, German field marshal (d. 1945)
1883 – Anton Webern, Austrian composer and conductor (d. 1945)
1884 – Rajendra Prasad, Indian lawyer and politician, 1st President of India (d. 1963)
  1884   – Walther Stampfli, Swiss lawyer and politician, 50th President of the Swiss Confederation (d. 1965)
1886 – Manne Siegbahn, Swedish physicist and academic, Nobel Prize laureate (d. 1978)
1887 – Prince Naruhiko Higashikuni, Japanese general and politician, 43rd Prime Minister of Japan (d. 1990)
1891 – Thomas Farrell, American general (d. 1967)
1894 – Deiva Zivarattinam, Indian lawyer and politician (d. 1975)
1895 – Anna Freud, Austrian-English psychologist and psychoanalyst (d. 1982)
  1895   – Sheng Shicai, Chinese warlord (d. 1970)
1897 – William Gropper, American cartoonist and painter (d. 1977)
1899 – Hayato Ikeda, Japanese politician, 58th Prime Minister of Japan (d. 1965)
  1899   – Howard Kinsey, American tennis player (d. 1966)
1900 – Albert Hawke, Australian politician, 18th Premier of Western Australia (d. 1986)
  1900   – Ulrich Inderbinen, Swiss mountaineer (d. 2004)
  1900   – Richard Kuhn, Austrian-German biochemist and academic, Nobel Prize laureate (d. 1967)

1901–present
1901 – Glenn Hartranft, American shot putter and discus thrower (d. 1970)
  1901   – Mildred Wiley, American high jumper (d. 2000)
1902 – Mitsuo Fuchida, Japanese captain and pilot (d. 1976)
  1902   – Feliks Kibbermann, Estonian chess player and philologist (d. 1993)
1904 – Edgar Moon, Australian tennis player (d. 1976)
1905 – Les Ames, English cricketer (d. 1990)
1907 – Connee Boswell, American jazz singer (d. 1976)
1911 – Nino Rota, Italian pianist, composer, conductor, and academic (d. 1979)
1914 – Irving Fine, American composer and academic (d. 1962)
1918 – Abdul Haris Nasution, Indonesian general and politician, 12th Indonesian Minister of Defence (d. 2000)
1919 – Charles Lynch, Canadian journalist and author (d. 1994)
1921 – Phyllis Curtin, American soprano and academic (d. 2016)
  1921   – John Doar, American lawyer and activist (d. 2014)
1922 – Len Lesser, American actor (d. 2011)
  1922   – Eli Mandel, Canadian poet, critic, and academic (d. 1992)
  1922   – Sven Nykvist, Swedish director and cinematographer (d. 2006)
1923 – Trevor Bailey, English cricketer and sportscaster (d. 2011)
  1923   – Stjepan Bobek, Croatian-Serbian footballer and manager (d. 2010)
  1923   – Moyra Fraser, Australian-English actress, singer, and dancer (d. 2009)
1924 – Wiel Coerver, Dutch footballer and manager (d. 2011)
  1924   – F. Sionil José, Filipino journalist, writer and author (d. 2022)
  1924   – Roberto Mieres, Argentinian race car driver and sailor (d. 2012)
1925 – Ferlin Husky, American country music singer (d. 2011)
1927 – Andy Williams, American singer (d. 2012)
1928 – Thomas M. Foglietta, American politician and diplomat, United States Ambassador to Italy (d. 2004)
  1928   – Muhammad Habibur Rahman, Indian-Bangladeshi jurist and politician, Prime Minister of Bangladesh (d. 2014)
1929 – John S. Dunne, American priest and theologian (d. 2013)
1930 – Jean-Luc Godard, French-Swiss director and screenwriter (d. 2022)
  1930   – Raul M. Gonzalez, Filipino lawyer and politician, 42nd Filipino Secretary of Justice (d. 2014)
  1930   – Yves Trudeau, Canadian sculptor (d. 2017)
1931 – Franz Josef Degenhardt, German author and poet (d. 2011)
  1931   – Jaye P. Morgan, American singer and actress
1932 – Takao Fujinami, Japanese lawyer and politician (d. 2007)
1933 – Paul J. Crutzen, Dutch chemist and engineer, Nobel Prize laureate (d. 2021)
1934 – Nicolas Coster, British-American actor
  1934   – Viktor Gorbatko, Russian general, pilot and cosmonaut (d. 2017)
  1934   – Abimael Guzmán, Peruvian philosopher and academic (d. 2021)
1935 – Eddie Bernice Johnson, American nurse and politician
1937 – Bobby Allison, American race car driver and businessman
  1937   – Morgan Llywelyn, American-Irish model and author
  1937   – Binod Bihari Verma, Indian physician and author (d. 2003)
1938 – Jean-Claude Malépart, Canadian lawyer and politician (d. 1989)
  1938   – Sally Shlaer, American mathematician and engineer (d. 1998)
1939 – John Paul, Sr., Dutch-American race car driver
  1939   – David Phillips, English chemist and academic
1940 – Jeffrey R. Holland, American academic and religious leader
1942 – Mike Gibson, Northern Irish-Irish rugby player
  1942   – Pedro Rocha, Uruguayan footballer and manager (d. 2013)
  1942   – Alice Schwarzer, German journalist and publisher, founded EMMA Magazine
  1942   – David K. Shipler, American journalist and author
1943 – J. Philippe Rushton, English-Canadian psychologist and academic (d. 2012)
  1943   – Joseph Franklin Ada, Guamanian lawyer and politician, 5th Governor of Guam
1944 – Ralph McTell, English singer-songwriter and guitarist
  1944   – Craig Raine, English poet, author, and playwright
  1944   – António Variações, Portuguese musician (d. 1984)
1948 – Jan Hrubý, Czech violinist and songwriter
  1948   – Maxwell Hutchinson, English architect and television host
  1948   – Ozzy Osbourne, English singer-songwriter
1949 – Heather Menzies, Canadian-American actress (d. 2017)
  1949   – Mickey Thomas, American singer-songwriter
1950 – Alberto Juantorena, Cuban runner
1951 – Mike Bantom, American basketball player and manager
  1951   – Ray Candy, American wrestler and trainer (d. 1994)
  1951   – Rick Mears, American race car driver
  1951   – Mike Stock, English songwriter, record producer, and musician
1952 – Don Barnes, American singer-songwriter and guitarist
  1952   – Benny Hinn, Israeli-American evangelist and author
  1952   – Duane Roland, American guitarist and songwriter (d. 2006)
1953 – Franz Klammer, Austrian skier and race car driver
  1953   – Rob Waring, American-Norwegian vibraphonist and contemporary composer
1954 – Grace Andreacchi, American-English author, poet, and playwright
1956 – Ewa Kopacz, Polish physician and politician, 15th Prime Minister of Poland
1957 – Maxim Korobov, Russian businessman and politician
1959 – Eamonn Holmes, Irish journalist and game show host
1960 – Daryl Hannah, American actress and producer
  1960   – Igor Larionov, Russian ice hockey player
  1960   – Julianne Moore, American actress and author
  1960   – Mike Ramsey, American ice hockey player and coach
1962 – Richard Bacon, English banker, journalist, and politician
  1962   – Nataliya Grygoryeva, Ukrainian hurdler
1963 – Joe Lally, American singer-songwriter and bass player
  1963   – Terri Schiavo, American medical patient (d. 2005)
1964 – Darryl Hamilton, American baseball player and sportscaster (d. 2015)
1965 – Andrew Stanton, American voice actor, director, producer, screenwriter
  1965   – Katarina Witt, German figure skater and actress
1966 – Flemming Povlsen, Danish footballer and manager
  1966   – Irina Zhuk, Russian figure skater and coach
1967 – Marie Françoise Ouedraogo, Burkinabé mathematician
1968 – Brendan Fraser, American actor and producer
  1968   – Montell Jordan, American singer-songwriter and producer
1969 – Bill Steer, English guitarist and songwriter
  1969   – Hal Steinbrenner, American businessman
1970 – Paul Byrd, American baseball player
  1970   – Lindsey Hunter, American basketball player and coach
  1970   – Christian Karembeu, French footballer
  1970   – Laura Schuler, Canadian ice hockey player and coach
1971 – Heiko Herrlich, German footballer and manager
  1971   – Frank Sinclair, English-Jamaican footballer and manager
  1971   – Henk Timmer, Dutch footballer and manager
  1971   – Vernon White, American mixed martial artist and wrestler
1972 – Danilo Goffi, Italian runner
1973 – Holly Marie Combs, American actress and producer
  1973   – MC Frontalot, American rapper
  1973   – Charl Willoughby, South African cricketer
1974 – Lucette Rådström, Swedish journalist
1976 – Mark Boucher, South African cricketer
  1976   – Gary Glover, American baseball player
  1976   – Cornelius Griffin, American football player
  1976   – Byron Kelleher, New Zealand rugby player
  1976   – Tomotaka Okamoto, Japanese soprano
1977 – Chad Durbin, American baseball player
  1977   – Troy Evans, American football player
  1977   – Adam Małysz, Polish ski jumper and race car driver
  1977   – Yelena Zadorozhnaya, Russian runner
1978 – Trina, American rapper and producer
  1978   – Daniel Alexandersson, Swedish footballer
  1978   – Jiří Bicek, Slovak ice hockey player
  1978   – Bram Tankink, Dutch cyclist
1979 – Daniel Bedingfield, New Zealand-English singer-songwriter
  1979   – Rock Cartwright, American football player
  1979   – Tiffany Haddish, American comedian and actress
1980 – Anna Chlumsky, American actress
  1980   – Jenna Dewan, American actress and dancer
1981 – Ioannis Amanatidis, Greek footballer
  1981   – Tyjuan Hagler, American football player
  1981   – Edwin Valero, Venezuelan boxer (d. 2010)
  1981   – David Villa, Spanish footballer
1982 – Manny Corpas, Panamanian baseball player
  1982   – Michael Essien, Ghanaian footballer
  1982   – Dascha Polanco, Dominican-American actress
  1982   – Franco Sbaraglini, Argentinian-Italian rugby player
1983 – Stephen Donald, New Zealand rugby player
  1983   – Sherri DuPree, American singer-songwriter and guitarist
  1983   – Andy Grammer, American singer, songwriter, and record producer
  1983   – James Ihedigbo, American football player
  1983   – Aleksey Drozdov, Russian decathlete
1984 – Avraam Papadopoulos, Greek footballer
  1984   – Manuel Arana, Spanish footballer
1985 – Nina Ansaroff, American martial artist
  1985   – László Cseh, Hungarian swimmer
  1985   – Mike Randolph, American soccer player
  1985   – Amanda Seyfried, American actress
  1985   – Robert Swift, American basketball player
  1985   – Marcus Williams, American basketball player
1987 – Michael Angarano, American actor, director, and screenwriter
  1987   – Erik Grönwall, Swedish singer-songwriter
  1987   – Brian Robiskie, American football player
  1987   – Alicia Sacramone, American gymnast
1988 – Melissa Aldana, Chilean saxophonist
1989 – Alex McCarthy, English footballer
  1989   – Selçuk Alibaz, Turkish footballer
  1989   – Tomasz Narkun, Polish mixed martial artist
1990 – Christian Benteke, Belgian footballer
  1990   – Sharon Fichman, Canadian-Israeli tennis player
1991 – Ekaterine Gorgodze, Georgian tennis player
1992 – Cristian Ceballos, Spanish footballer
1994 – Solomone Kata, New Zealand rugby league player
  1994   – Lil Baby, American rapper
  1994   – Bernarda Pera, American tennis player

Deaths

Pre-1600
311 – Diocletian, Roman emperor (b. 244)
 649 – Birinus, French-English bishop and saint (b. 600)
 860 – Abbo, bishop of Auxerre
 937 – Siegfried, Frankish nobleman
 978 – Abraham, Coptic pope of Alexandria
1038 – Emma of Lesum, Saxon countess and Saint
1099 – Saint Osmund (b. 1065)
1154 – Pope Anastasius IV (b. 1073)
1265 – Odofredus, Italian lawyer and jurist
1266 – Henry III the White, Duke of Wroclaw
1309 – Henry III, Duke of Głogów (b. 1251/60)
1322 – Maud Chaworth, Countess of Leicester (b. 1282)
1532 – Louis II, Count Palatine of Zweibrücken (b. 1502)
1533 – Vasili III of Russia (b. 1479)
1542 – Jean Tixier de Ravisi, French scholar and academic (b. 1470)
1552 – Francis Xavier, Spanish missionary and saint (b. 1506)
1592 – Alexander Farnese, Duke of Parma (b. 1545)

1601–1900
1610 – Honda Tadakatsu, Japanese general and daimyō (b. 1548)
1668 – William Cecil, 2nd Earl of Salisbury (b. 1591)
1691 – Katherine Jones, Viscountess Ranelagh, British scientist (b. 1615)
1706 – Countess Emilie Juliane of Barby-Mühlingen (b. 1637)
1752 – Henri-Guillaume Hamal, Walloon musician and composer (b. 1685)
1765 – Lord John Sackville, English cricketer and politician (b. 1713)
1789 – Claude Joseph Vernet, French painter (b. 1714)
1815 – John Carroll, American archbishop (b. 1735)
1876 – Samuel Cooper, American general (b. 1798)
1882 – Archibald Tait, Scottish-English archbishop (b. 1811)
1888 – Carl Zeiss, German physicist and lens maker, created the optical instrument (b. 1816)
1890 – Billy Midwinter, English-Australian cricketer (b. 1851)
1892 – Afanasy Fet, Russian author and poet (b. 1820)
1894 – Robert Louis Stevenson, Scottish novelist, poet, and essayist (b. 1850)

1901–present
1902 – Robert Lawson, New Zealand architect, designed the Otago Boys' High School and Knox Church (b. 1833)
1904 – David Bratton, American water polo player (b. 1869)
1910 – Mary Baker Eddy, American religious leader and author, founded Christian Science (b. 1821)
1912 – Prudente de Morais, Brazilian lawyer and politician, 3rd President of Brazil (b. 1841)
1917 – Harold Garnett, English-French cricketer (b. 1879)
1919 – Pierre-Auguste Renoir, French painter and sculptor (b. 1841)
1928 – Ezra Meeker, American farmer and politician (b. 1830)
1934 – Charles James O'Donnell, Irish lawyer and politician (b. 1849)
1935 – Princess Victoria of the United Kingdom (b. 1868)
1937 – William Propsting, Australian politician, 20th Premier of Tasmania (b. 1861)
1941 – Pavel Filonov, Russian painter and poet (b. 1883)
1949 – Maria Ouspenskaya, Russian-American actress and educator (b. 1876)
1952 – Rudolf Margolius, Czech lawyer and politician (b. 1913)
1956 – Manik Bandopadhyay, Indian author, poet, and playwright (b. 1908)
  1956   – Alexander Rodchenko, Russian sculptor, photographer, and graphic designer (b. 1891)
1967 – Harry Wismer, American football player and sportscaster (b. 1913)
1972 – William Manuel Johnson, American bassist (b. 1872)
1973 – Emile Christian, American trombonist, cornet player, and composer (b. 1895)
  1973   – Adolfo Ruiz Cortines, President of Mexico, 1952-1958 (b. 1889)
1979 – Dhyan Chand, Indian field hockey player and coach (b. 1905)
1980 – Oswald Mosley, English lieutenant, fascist, and politician, Chancellor of the Duchy of Lancaster (b. 1896)
1981 – Walter Knott, American farmer, founded Knott's Berry Farm (b. 1889)
  1981   – Joel Rinne, Finnish actor (b. 1897)
1984 – Vladimir Abramovich Rokhlin, Azerbaijani-Russian mathematician and academic (b. 1919)
1989 – Fernando Martín Espina, Spanish basketball player (b. 1962)
  1989   – Connie B. Gay, American businessman, founded the Country Music Association (b. 1914)
1993 – Lewis Thomas, American physician, etymologist, and academic (b. 1913)
1996 – Georges Duby, French historian and author (b. 1919)
1998 – Pierre Hétu, Canadian pianist and conductor (b. 1936)
1999 – John Archer, American actor (b. 1915)
  1999   – Scatman John, American singer-songwriter and pianist (b. 1942)
  1999   – Madeline Kahn, American actress, comedian, and singer (b. 1942)
  1999   – Horst Mahseli, Polish footballer (b. 1934)
  1999   – Jarl Wahlström, Finnish 12th General of The Salvation Army (b. 1918)
2000 – Gwendolyn Brooks, American poet and educator (b. 1917)
  2000   – Hoyt Curtin, American composer and producer (b. 1922)
2002 – Adrienne Adams, American illustrator (b. 1906)
  2002   – Glenn Quinn, Irish-American actor (b. 1970)
2003 – David Hemmings, English actor (b. 1941)
  2003   – Sita Ram Goel, Indian historian, publisher and writer (b. 1921)
2004 – Shiing-Shen Chern, Chinese-American mathematician and academic (b. 1911)
2005 – Frederick Ashworth, American admiral (b. 1912)
  2005   – Herb Moford, American baseball player (b. 1928)
  2005   – Kikka Sirén, Finnish pop/schlager singer (b. 1964)
2007 – James Kemsley, Australian cartoonist and actor (b. 1948)
2008 – Robert Zajonc, Polish-American psychologist and author (b. 1923)
2009 – Leila Lopes, Brazilian actress and journalist (b. 1959)
  2009   – Richard Todd, Irish-born British soldier and actor (b. 1919)
2010 – Abdumalik Bahori, Azerbaijani poet and author (b. 1927)
2011 – Dev Anand, Indian actor, director, and producer (b. 1923)
2012 – Jules Mikhael Al-Jamil, Iraqi-Lebanese archbishop (b. 1938)
  2012   – Kuntal Chandra, Bangladeshi cricketer (b. 1984)
  2012   – Fyodor Khitruk, Russian animator, director, and screenwriter (b. 1917)
  2012   – Diego Mendieta, Paraguayan footballer (b. 1980)
  2012   – Janet Shaw, Australian cyclist and author (b. 1966)
2013 – Paul Aussaresses, French general (b. 1918)
  2013   – Reda Mahmoud Hafez Mohamed, Egyptian air marshal (b. 1952)
  2013   – Ahmed Fouad Negm, Egyptian poet and educator (b. 1929)
2014 – Herman Badillo, Puerto Rican-American lawyer and politician (b. 1929)
  2014   – Jacques Barrot, French politician, French European Commissioner (b. 1937)
  2014   – Nathaniel Branden, Canadian–American psychotherapist and author (b. 1930)
  2014   – Ian McLagan, English-American singer-songwriter and keyboard player (b. 1945)
  2014   – James Stewart, Canadian mathematician and academic (b. 1941)
2015 – Gladstone Anderson, Jamaican singer and pianist (b. 1934)
  2015   – Eevi Huttunen, Finnish speed skater (b. 1922)
  2015   – Scott Weiland, American singer-songwriter (b. 1967)

Holidays and observances
 Christian feast day:
 Abbo of Auxerre
 Pope Abraham of Alexandria (Coptic, 6 Koiak))
 Adrian (Ethernan)
 Birinus
 Cassian of Tangier
 Emma (of Lesum or of Bremen)
 Francis Xavier
 Blessed Johann Nepomuk von Tschiderer zu Gleifheim
 Zephaniah
 December 3 (Eastern Orthodox liturgics)
 Doctors' Day (Cuba)
 International Day of Persons with Disabilities

References

External links

 BBC: On This Day
 
 Historical Events on December 3

Days of the year
December